Aghbargai Khullah is a town in the Federally Administered Tribal Areas of Pakistan. It is located at 32°23'46N 69°56'51E with an altitude of 1190 metres (3907 feet).

References

Populated places in Khyber Pakhtunkhwa